Palmer Heights is a census-designated place (CDP) in Palmer Heights, Pennsylvania. The population of Palmer Heights was 3,762 at the 2010 census. Palmer Heights is part of the Lehigh Valley, which had a population of 861,899 and was the 68th most populous metropolitan area in the U.S. as of the 2020 census.

Geography
Palmer Heights is located at  (40.691698, -75.265654).

Demographics
As of the census of 2000, there were 3,612 people, 1,405 households, and 1,036 families residing in the CDP. The population density was 3,012.6 people per square mile (1,162.2/km2). There were 1,428 housing units at an average density of 1,191.0/sq mi (459.5/km2). The racial makeup of the CDP was 95.43% White, 1.66% African American, 0.11% Native American, 1.25% Asian, 0.03% Pacific Islander, 0.91% from other races, and 0.61% from two or more races. Hispanic or Latino of any race were 2.63% of the population.

There were 1,405 households, out of which 25.5% had children under the age of 18 living with them, 65.4% were married couples living together, 5.8% had a female householder with no husband present, and 26.2% were non-families. 22.6% of all households were made up of individuals, and 14.0% had someone living alone who was 65 years of age or older. The average household size was 2.43 and the average family size was 2.86.

In the CDP, the population was spread out, with 17.6% under the age of 18, 5.0% from 18 to 24, 23.7% from 25 to 44, 27.2% from 45 to 64, and 26.5% who were 65 years of age or older. The median age was 47 years. For every 100 females, there were 90.0 males. For every 100 females age 18 and over, there were 85.5 males.

The median income for a household in the CDP was $51,625, and the median income for a family was $61,630. Males had a median income of $40,481 versus $32,429 for females. The per capita income for the CDP was $23,959. About 2.0% of families and 2.6% of the population were below the poverty line, including none of those under age 18 and 7.5% of those age 65 or over.

Public education
The community is served by the Easton Area School District. Students in grades nine through 12 attend Easton Area High School in Easton.

References

Census-designated places in Northampton County, Pennsylvania
Census-designated places in Pennsylvania